Fernando Soto may refer to:

Fernando Soto (Mexican actor)
Fernando Soto (Spanish actor)
Fernando Soto Aparicio, Colombian poet